This is a list of countries by northernmost point on land.  Where borders are contested, the northernmost point under the control of a nation is listed.

Notes

Northernmost point
Geography-related lists